Perdicula is a small genus of quail in the family Phasianidae, containing four species that are collectively known as the bush quails.

Taxonomy 
The generic name Perdicula is a Modern Latin diminutive of the genus Perdix, and means small partridge. The two genera are not closely related, with Perdix belonging to the tribe Phasianini in subfamily Phasianinae, while Perdicula belongs to the tribe Coturnicini in the subfamily Pavoninae.

The genus contains the following four species:

References

 

Bird genera